Iman Crosson (born March 27, 1982), better known by his stage name Alphacat, is an American actor, impressionist, and YouTube personality known for his impersonations of former U.S. President Barack Obama and his starring role in independent film Along the Roadside.

YouTube and Barack Obama impressions

On December 14, 2005, a 23-year-old Crosson opened a YouTube account with screen name Alphacat.  In July 2008, at the urging of his fellow waiters Crosson created spoof videos of then U.S. presidential candidate Barack Obama.

During the summer of the 2008 U.S. Presidential election campaign, Crosson's 30-second video won Denny's Restaurant's nationwide contest for the best impressionist of the then-candidate Barack Obama.  He said that he "went from unemployed to self-employed in literally a matter of a month."  Crosson moved from New York to California, obtained an agent specializing in helping talent cross over from online to mainstream, and was invited to be on America's Got Talent.

On YouTube, Crosson specialized in mashing up his Obama impersonations with hip-hop songs, his spoofs of Beyoncé's "Single Ladies" and T.I.'s "Whatever I Like" being viewed 20 million times each.

After Obama's January 2009 inauguration, Crosson was featured on several entertainment and news television shows, blogs, and newspapers. Crosson was called a "YouTube sensation" by Fox News' Neil Cavuto.

Crosson's post-inaugural work included voice-overs in Newsweek's The District, a video series in which Crosson narrated Obama's first months in Washington from the President's point of view.  Crosson impersonated Obama at the 66th Annual Radio and Television Correspondents' Association Dinner on March 17, 2010.

In October 2012, Crosson performed as Obama in the YouTube series Epic Rap Battles of History in the "Barack Obama vs. Mitt Romney" episode, the music single of which was  certified gold by the RIAA.  Additionally, Crosson appeared as President Broccoli Obama in an episode of The Annoying Orange.

In December 2013, Crosson contributed to an Affordable Care Act ("Obamacare") health care exchange's "Tell a friend – Get covered" social media campaign for raising awareness among young Americans to enroll in Obamacare-compliant health insurance, by releasing a video spoof of Snoop Dogg's "Drop It Like It's Hot."

In February 2014, YouTube content creators including Crosson met with U.S. President Obama at the White House to discuss ways in which government could connect with the content creators' viewers, concerning awareness of and enrollment in health insurance policies and other issues.

On May 28, 2014 Crosson as well as other YouTubers and Viners (Andrew Bachelor (King Bach) and DeStorm Power) appeared in will.i.am's Vine music video for "It's My Birthday" ft. Cody Wise.

Crosson has been the voice actor of Barack Obama in Our Cartoon President.

Films

Crosson played the male lead role in the independent film Along the Roadside with supporting actor Michael Madsen, the film debuting at the February 2013 FEST with its commercial release on March 17, 2015.

Crosson played U.S. President Barack Obama in the 2016 Bollywood comedy sequel, Tere Bin Laden: Dead or Alive, which was filmed in Mumbai, India.

See also
 President Obama on Death of Osama bin Laden

References

External links

 
 
 

1982 births
Living people
African-American male actors
Male actors from California
American impressionists (entertainers)
Wright State University alumni
RPM channels
RPM people
American YouTubers
YouTube channels launched in 2005
21st-century American comedians
People from Louisville, Kentucky